Oregon Office of Emergency Management (OEM) is an emergency services system authorized by the U.S. state of Oregon legislature to coordinate efforts to "prevent, prepare for, respond to and recover from emergencies".

Description 
The OEM maintains emergency services systems as mandated in Oregon Revised Statutes, Chapter 401, by "planning, preparing and providing for the prevention, mitigation and management of emergencies or disasters that present a threat to the lives and property of citizens of and visitors to the State of Oregon." OEM's director has said,

Administratively, OEM is a division of the Oregon Military Department. There are four sections of OEM:

 Director's Office
 Technology and Response
 Operations and Preparedness
 Mitigation and Recovery Services

OEM manages resources for disaster assistance, cross-jurisdictional aid to protect lives, property and  the environment, and other assistance with emergency incidents. OEM also manages grant opportunities, preparedness workshops, state preparedness exercises and training, and toolkits for emergency managers.

Within OEM's responsibilities are the disaster declaration process, the Oregon Emergency Response System, the Real-Time Assessment and Planning Tool for Oregon, and the state's search and rescue program.

OEM maintains a command center in Salem.

History 
Following federal passage of the Robert T. Stafford Disaster Relief and Emergency Assistance Act in 1974, and the 1979 establishment of FEMA, in 1981 the Oregon legislature established the state's Emergency Management Division. In 1993, passage of Senate Bill 157 transferred the Emergency Management Division to the Department of State Police, renaming it the "Office of Emergency Management".

OEM's authorization and responsibilities are defined in Oregon Revised Statutes, Chapter 401 — Emergency Management and Services.

References 

1981 establishments in Oregon
State agencies of Oregon